Longdong station may refer to:

 Longdong station (Guangzhou Metro), a station on Line 6 (Guangzhou Metro)
 , a station on Line 3 (Jinan Metro)
 Longdong station (Shenzhen Metro), a station under construction on Line 16 (Shenzhen Metro)